The thyrohyoid muscle is a small skeletal muscle on the neck. It originates from the lamina of the thyroid cartilage, and inserts into the greater cornu of the hyoid bone. It is supplied by the hypoglossal nerve, and a branch of the ventral rami of the cervical plexus, spinal nerve C1, which travels with the hypoglossal nerve. The thyrohyoid muscle depresses the hyoid bone and elevates the larynx. By controlling the position and shape of the larynx, it aids in making sound.

Structure 
The thyrohyoid muscle is a quadrilateral muscle in shape. It appears like an upward continuation of the sternothyroid muscle. It belongs to the infrahyoid muscles group. It lies in the carotid triangle.

It arises from the oblique line on the lamina of the thyroid cartilage. It is inserted into the lower border of the greater cornu of the hyoid bone.

Nerve supply 
The thyrohyoid muscle is supplied by the hypoglossal nerve (XII). It is the only infrahyoid muscle that is not supplied by the ansa cervicalis. It is also supplied by the thyrohyoid branch of cervical spinal nerve 1 (C1). This is via the cervical plexus. This nerve branches from the first cervical nerve as it joins the hypoglossal nerve for a short distance.

Function 
The thyrohyoid muscle depresses the hyoid bone and elevates the larynx and the thyroid cartilage, drawing them together. By controlling the position and shape of the larynx, it aids in making sound.

Other animals 
The thyrohyoid muscle is found in many other animals, including horses.

Additional images

See also 
 Muscular triangle
 Thyrohyoid membrane

References

External links 
 
 
 
 PTCentral

Muscles of the head and neck